The discography of American singer Donna Summer includes 17 studio albums and 89 singles, plus several other releases. Her first single, "Wassermann", a German version of the song "Aquarius" from the musical Hair, was released in Europe in 1968 under her maiden name, Donna Gaines. She would become known as Donna Summer from 1974 onwards. Her first full-length album under that name was Lady of the Night.

Summer has sold more than 100 million records worldwide. Billboard list her as the 14th greatest female soloist of all time (51st overall). She has scored three number one albums on the US Billboard 200 and sixteen number one hits on the US Dance Club Songs, earning her title as the reigning "Queen of Disco". Bad Girls remains the biggest selling album of her career with over 4 million copies sold worldwide. Summer holds the record for most consecutive double albums to hit number one on the Billboard charts (3) and first female to have four number-one singles in a 12 month period; three as a solo artist and one as a duet with Barbra Streisand.

Label associations
Summer's debut album, Lady of the Night, was released only in the Netherlands by Groovy Records. This was followed by her first international release, Love to Love You Baby, issued by Giorgio Moroder's Oasis Records in association with Casablanca Records in the United States and Canada. (At this time Summer would again become based in the United States, having lived in Germany for several years previously.) "Love to Love You Baby" was her first single in the US; it was recorded on Oasis Records, which would join with Casablanca Records to release it in the US. Casablanca would assume responsibility for recording and distributing Summer's albums during the 1970s and also become one of the premier labels of that decade.

While Casablanca would become the main label responsible for managing Summer, Groovy continued to distribute her work in the Netherlands and other labels were used to distribute her work in other countries, such as GTO in the United Kingdom, Atlantic in Germany and France, Polar in Sweden and Durium in Italy. From 1977's Once Upon a Time... album, Casablanca would take over the distribution of Summer's albums in most countries (though her releases in the Netherlands would be issued by Philips and (until 1978 and 1979 respectively) would continue to be issued by Atlantic in Germany and France). As a result, some of her former labels released hits compilation albums in an attempt to cash in on losing her: GTO even scored a Top 5 placing in the United Kingdom with The Greatest Hits of Donna Summer. Summer remained with Casablanca, who helped make her one of the biggest stars in music and "The Queen of Disco" until the end of 1979, when she left due to personal and professional disputes with them and filed a lawsuit against them.

Summer subsequently became the first ever artist to be signed to David Geffen's Geffen Records and, after refusing to release her second album recorded for them (in 1981), they requested that she no longer work with long-term collaborator Giorgio Moroder, who had produced and co-written the vast majority of her hits in the previous decade. From the following album (issued in 1982), her Geffen work outside North America would be distributed by Warner Bros. Records, the umbrella company to Geffen.

By 1983, Casablanca had been bought out by PolyGram Records, who informed Summer that she still owed them an album as per her legal settlement with Casablanca. She delivered the album She Works Hard for the Money, which PolyGram chose to release on its Mercury Records imprint as opposed to Casablanca, Summer's former label. Following this, she released another album with Geffen a year later, but they reportedly refused to release much of her material in the remainder of the decade and, after they refused to release her album Another Place and Time in 1988, Summer left the label. However, Warner Bros. released the record in Europe the following year where it became a success, resulting in Summer being signed to their Atlantic label in North America. She remained signed to Atlantic and Warner Bros. until the early 1990s.

In 1990, Geffen Records was sold to MCA Records, which was owned by alcoholic beverage-maker Seagram; although Summer was no longer an artist on Geffen Records. In 1998, PolyGram and its imprints were purchased by Seagram, which merged the company with its MCA Records label and imprints to create the gigantic Universal Music Group. This had the result of Summer's MCA, Oasis, Casablanca, Geffen, and Mercury releases now being owned by one conglomerate, Universal Music. This catalogue of Summer's material stretches from 1971 to 1987 for Universal Music Group.

Summer again signed to PolyGram's Mercury label, who released two hits compilation albums, her 1994 Christmas album and the previously unreleased second Geffen album from 1981. Mercury also re-released some of Summer's Warner Bros. albums in the 1990s. By the end of the decade, she was signed to Sony's Epic Records, who released a live album. Her final album, in 2008, was released by Sony's Burgundy Records.

After 1987, Donna Summer owned the masters to her recordings released by Geffen/Warner Bros, Atlantic Records, Epic Records and Burgundy Records releases.

Albums

 All albums were released internationally unless otherwise stated. The record labels given are those used to release the records in the US (unless of course they were not released in that country). As explained in the previous paragraph, other labels were sometimes used to distribute Summer's work in other countries (most notably for the Casablanca/Geffen/Atlantic albums). From Once Upon a Time through to the end of the Casablanca albums, this label was used to distribute Summer's work in most nations.

Studio albums

 Released in the Netherlands only.
 Love to Love You Baby and A Love Trilogy released by Oasis in North America in association with Casablanca.
 Love to Love You Baby, A Love Trilogy, Four Seasons of Love and I Remember Yesterday released by various labels outside of North America including Groovy, who continued to distribute Summer's work in the Netherlands, GTO in the United Kingdom and Atlantic in Germany and France. Once Upon a Time... also released by Atlantic in Germany and France.
 Once Upon a Time... and Bad Girls released by Philips in the Netherlands.
 Recorded in 1981 but unreleased until 1996 and released in North America and Japan only.
 Recorded in 1981 while Summer was signed to Geffen (who refused to release it). Eventually released by Mercury in 1996.
 Released by Warner Bros. outside of North America.
 Released only in North America.

Live albums

 Released by Philips in the Netherlands and Atlantic in France.

Compilations

Main compilations
These compilation albums were issued by the record labels to which Summer was signed at the time of their releases. She had full involvement in the putting together of them and recorded new material for them.

 Released by Philips in The Netherlands; also available there with different artwork under the title Wereldsuccessen.

Other official compilations
These compilation albums were also issued by the record labels to which Summer was signed (or had recently left) at the time of their releases. However, some of them were only released in certain countries (particularly if a certain label was used to distribute Summer's work exclusively in that country/those countries) and none contained any new material from Summer (although The Donna Summer Anthology featured two tracks from the then unreleased 1981 I'm A Rainbow album).

 Released only in The Netherlands and Germany with different artwork by Groovy and Atlantic respectively. These labels were responsible for distributing Summer's earlier work in those countries and released the compilations independently of any other label.
 Released only in the United Kingdom (with a slightly different track listing to the Dutch/German Greatest Hits releases and similar [but not identical] artwork to the Dutch one) by GTO. This label was responsible for distributing Summer's earlier work in that country and released the compilation independently of any other label.
 Released only in South America.
 Released only outside of North America. It was issued by Warner Bros., who had been responsible for distributing much of Summer's material outside of North America since 1980. This work had been distributed in North America firstly by Geffen and later Atlantic, both of which were Warner Bros. companies. Atlantic (to whom Donna was still signed in North America at the time) did not release the compilation there.
 Released in Europe and different from the 2003 compilation of the same name.

Miscellaneous compilations

Remix albums

Film soundtracks 

 Released by Full Moon and distributed by Asylum in North America and Warner Music Group in other countries.

Cast recordings

Guest appearances

Singles

Commercially released singles

1968–1975 (Pre-Casablanca signing)
Summer's first single, "Wassermann" was taken from the German cast recording of the musical Hair and released by Polydor Records. The next few singles were one-offs that were not major hits, released on different labels, until she was signed to the Dutch label Groovy Records in 1974 ("The Hostage" being her first single for them). Atlantic Records became responsible for distributing Summer's work in Germany at the same time and both labels would continue to distribute Summer's work in the respective countries for the following few years (including the first few years of her signing to Casablanca Records in North America).

 Released in Germany only.
 Released in the Netherlands, Belgium and France only.
 Released in the Netherlands only.
None of the above singles were released outside of just a few countries in Europe. "Sally Go 'Round the Roses" and "The Hostage" were released in the United Kingdom, but were not UK hits. Summer scored hits in the Netherlands with "Let's Work Together Now", "Lady of the Night", and "Love to Love You" (later named "Love to Love You Baby").

1975–1980 (Casablanca Records era)
These singles were all released commercially in at least one format in one country. Promotional formats may have also been released in that country/those countries or in others.

Summer's recordings during this era were distributed by Casablanca Records in North America and, from late 1977 onwards, in most other nations. Various other labels released Summer's work internationally prior to said time (and in a small number of cases, during it). Summer left the label in 1979 but they continued to issue previously released material for a while afterwards.

Singles from the film soundtracks of The Deep and Thank God It's Friday were distributed internationally by Casablanca, as that label was responsible for releasing the soundtracks worldwide.

 Not released commercially in the United Kingdom.
 Released commercially in selected countries (including North America and the Netherlands) with "I Feel Love" as the B-side. The two sides were switched around soon after release and issued with "Can't We Just Sit Down" as the B-side internationally.
 Not released commercially in North America.
 Released commercially in Germany only.
 Released commercially in Japan only.
 Released commercially in South America only.
 Also released by Streisand's label (Columbia Records) on different formats in different countries (hence its inclusion in the "Guest Appearances" section also). Sales/airplay of all formats on both labels were amalgamated.
 Released commercially in Spain only.

1980–1991 (Geffen/Atlantic/Warner Bros. era)
These singles were all released commercially in at least one format in one country. Promotional formats may have also been released in that country/those countries or in others.

Summer's material during this era was released by three different Warner Bros. labels: Geffen, Atlantic and the main Warner Bros. label. In North America, Summer was signed to Geffen from 1980 to 1988 and Atlantic from 1989 to 1991. Internationally, Geffen released her material from 1980 to 1981 but all subsequent Geffen/Atlantic releases were released by Warner Bros. Records.

Summer's original North American label (Casablanca), now owned by PolyGram, also released two official Donna Summer singles in the United Kingdom in 1982 and 1983 respectively; these were new remixes and/or edits of two of Summer's biggest hits from during her time with that label. See notes below for details.

During Summer's court battle regarding her leaving Casablanca, it was decided that she still owed them an album. Subsequently, PolyGram's Mercury Records released the 1983 album She Works Hard For The Money, so all singles from that album were also released by Mercury.

 Released commercially in Japan only.
 Released commercially in the United Kingdom only.
 Released commercially in Belgium, The Netherlands and Japan only.
 Released commercially in The Netherlands only.
 Released commercially in Spain only.
 Not released commercially in North America.
 Released commercially in North America and Japan only.
 Released commercially in North America only.

1993–2020
These singles were all released commercially in at least one format in one country. Promotional formats may have also been released in that country/those countries or in others.

Several of the singles from this era are in fact from albums by various artists on which Summer appeared.

PolyGram released the 1994 compilation album Endless Summer, so the two singles from that album (both newly recorded tracks) were released on Mercury, as were the 1999 and 2000 re-releases of "Last Dance" and "I Feel Love" respectively.

The remixes of "I Feel Love" and "State of Independence" were released by the former UK-based Manifesto label, a division of Universal (who had owned the rights to much of Summer's back catalogue for some time).

Summer signed to Sony in 1999 and both her singles from that year were released by their Epic label. Summer's final album (2008's Crayons) and the singles from it were released by Sony's Burgundy Records.

Universal released 2005's "I Got Your Love", originally featured two years earlier in the television series Sex and the City.

The final Donna Summer single, "To Paris with Love" was released on her own Driven by the Music label.

The posthumous remix album released in 2013 (entitled Love to Love You Donna) and its singles were released by Verve Records, by then part of Universal Music Group, who had long since owned the rights to Summer's Casablanca/PolyGram recordings from 1975 to 1983.

 Released commercially in France only.
 Released commercially in North America only.
 Released commercially in the United Kingdom only.
 Not released commercially in the United Kingdom.
 Not released commercially in North America.

Promotional singles

 Released in the United Kingdom only.
 Released in North America only.

Other charted songs

Dance Club Play chart entries

From the inception of the Billboard Dance Club Play chart (also known as Club Play Singles, and formerly known as Hot Dance Club Play and Hot Dance/Disco) until the week of February 16, 1991, several (or even all) songs on an EP or album could occupy the same position if more than one track from a release was receiving significant play in clubs. Beginning with the February 23, 1991, issue, the dance chart became "song specific," meaning only one song could occupy each position at a time. Therefore;
 "Wasted" and "Come With Me" charted at #7 due to their inclusion on the A Love Trilogy album, so the chart position is in fact for the entire album. The reason these two tracks have been singled out is because the other two tracks on the album ("Could It Be Magic" and "Try Me, I Know We Can Make It") reached their own peak positions when they were released as singles.
 "Spring Affair" and "Winter Melody" both appear on Summer's Four Seasons of Love album, so their joint #1 position is actually for the whole album.
 "Can't We Just Sit Down (And Talk It Over)", "I Feel Love", "I Remember Yesterday", "Love's Unkind" and "Back in Love Again" all appear on Summer's I Remember Yesterday album, so their #1 position is also for the full album..
 "I Love You", "Fairy Tale High", "Once Upon a Time" and "Rumour Has It" all appear on her Once Upon a Time album, so again the #1 position is in fact for the whole album.
 "Last Dance" shared its entry with three other tracks from the Thank God It's Friday film soundtrack, none of which were sung by Summer (though she was credited as co-writer and background vocalist on "Take It to the Zoo", a track by her sisters' group Sunshine.
 "MacArthur Park" and "Heaven Knows" are both part of a medley titled "MacArthur Park Suite," which was released as a 12" single for use in clubs. A slightly different version appears on the Live And More album.
 "Hot Stuff" and "Bad Girls" was released for use in clubs as a continuous medley on a one-sided 12" single, so these two also count as one #1 on this chart.
 "The Wanderer", "Cold Love", "Who Do You Think You're Foolin'", and "Looking Up" all appear on Summer's The Wanderer album, so yet again their entry is for the whole album.

Guest appearances
All of the following singles were released commercially.

 Also released by Summer's label on different formats in different countries (hence its inclusion in the main section also). Sales/airplay of all formats on both labels were amalgamated.

Music videos

References

External links
[ Donna Summer discography at Billboard.com]
[ Donna Summer discography at Allmusicguide.com]

Discographies of American artists
Pop music discographies
discography
Electronic music discographies
Disco discographies